Gary Albert Williamson (born May 25, 1950) is a Canadian former professional ice hockey player.

During the 1973–74 season, Williamson played nine games in the World Hockey Association with the Houston Aeros.

References

External links

1950 births
Living people
Canadian ice hockey forwards
Greensboro Generals (SHL) players
Houston Aeros (WHA) players
Ice hockey people from Montreal
Macon Whoopees (SHL) players
Providence Friars men's ice hockey players